Digit Channel Connect is a monthly publication targeting the IT distribution and reseller channel, aimed at IT resellers, retailers, distributors and system integrators. 9.9 Media publishes the magazine.

References

External links
 Official website

9.9 Media Products
English-language magazines published in India
Computer magazines published in India
Monthly magazines published in India
Magazines with year of establishment missing